Duquesne University Press, founded in 1927, is a publisher that is part of Duquesne University, in Pittsburgh, Pennsylvania.

The Press is the scholarly publishing arm of Duquesne University, and publishes monographs and collections in the humanities and social sciences. In particular, the university press's editorial program includes the following specific fields: literature studies (Medieval and Renaissance), philosophy, psychology, religious studies and theology, spirituality, and creative nonfiction.

See also

 List of English-language book publishing companies
 List of university presses

References

External links
Duquesne University Press
The Duquesne University Press's listing on the AAUP website

Press
University presses of the United States
Publishing companies established in 1927
Book publishing companies based in Pennsylvania
1927 establishments in Pennsylvania